{{Infobox animanga/Print
| type            = manga
| author          = Katsura Ise
| illustrator     = Takuma Yokota
| publisher       = Kadokawa Shoten
| publisher_en    = 
| demographic     = Shōnen
| imprint         = 
| magazine        = Monthly Shōnen Ace
| first           = November 26, 2018
| last            = 
| volumes         = 11
| volume_list     = 
}}

 is a Japanese manga series written by Katsura Ise and illustrated by Takuma Yokota. It follows a pair of academic rivals in high school growing closer over games of Magic: The Gathering, during the late 90s. The series began serialization in Kadokawa Shoten's Monthly Shōnen Ace magazine on November 26, 2018, with cooperation from Wizards of the Coast LLC.

 Synopsis 
In 1998, Hajime Kanou is a junior high student and firm otaku enamored with the collectible card game Magic: The Gathering (colloquially referred to as "Magic"), playing games with his classmates every day during breaks. His loud group often catches the attention of Emi Sawatari, the top student of the school with impeccable social standing and perfect grades, who continually berates Hajime's group for bringing such games to school. Since middle school, Hajime has seen Emi as his self-proclaimed academic rival, although is frequently defeated. Their differences in attitudes and personality lead to them not getting along at first. 

One day, Hajime pays a visit to a shop specialising in Magic and, to his surprise, finds Emi inside. He discovers that, not only does Emi play Magic, she is one of the most competent players in the store. This meeting ultimately leads to a change in their relationship with them becoming closer together as they get to know each other through their various Magic duels and related encounters.

Characters

A junior high student nerd who plays Magic: The Gathering everyday, even during breaks.

The top student of the school who Hajime always see as a worth rival to beat. She excels in academic scores, and is one of the top players of Magic: The Gathering.

 Publication Destroy All Humankind. They Can't Be Regenerated. is written by Katsura Ise and illustrated by Takuma Yokota. Prior to serialization, the pair previously published a one-shot version of the manga in the October issue of Monthly Shōnen Ace on August 25, 2018. The series began serialization in the January issue of the same magazine on November 26, 2018.

To celebrate the release of the third volume on November 26, 2019, a 23 minute "voice comic" video was published on YouTube featuring the voices of Tomoya Takagi, Kato Wataru, Misaki Yoshioka, and Mayuko Kazama.

 Volume list 

 References 

 External links 
 Destroy All Humankind. They Can't Be Regenerated.'' at ComicWalker 
 

Kadokawa Dwango franchises
Kadokawa Shoten manga
Magic: The Gathering
Shōnen manga